Mechlenberg Heights is an unincorporated community in Jefferson County, West Virginia, United States. Mechlenberg Heights lies to the west of Shepherdstown along West Virginia Route 45.

References

Unincorporated communities in Jefferson County, West Virginia
Unincorporated communities in West Virginia